Kim Iong-a (born 3 August 1992), also known as Aliya Kim, is a South Korean-born Kazakhstani short track speed skater. She competed in the women's 500 metres at the 2018 Winter Olympics.

References

External links
 

1992 births
Living people
South Korean female short track speed skaters
Kazakhstani female short track speed skaters
Olympic short track speed skaters of Kazakhstan
Short track speed skaters at the 2018 Winter Olympics
Asian Games medalists in short track speed skating
Asian Games bronze medalists for Kazakhstan
Short track speed skaters at the 2017 Asian Winter Games
Medalists at the 2017 Asian Winter Games
Universiade medalists in short track speed skating
South Korean emigrants to Kazakhstan
Kazakhstani people of Korean descent
Universiade bronze medalists for Kazakhstan
Competitors at the 2017 Winter Universiade